Marunuma Dam is a buttress dam located in Gunma Prefecture in Japan. The dam is used for power production. The catchment area of the dam is 25.9 km2. The dam impounds about 68  ha of land when full and can store 13600 thousand cubic meters of water. The construction of the dam was started on 1928 and completed in 1931.

References

Dams in Gunma Prefecture